"Game Over (Flip)" is the lead single released from Lil' Flip's third album U Gotta Feel Me.

The song became Flip's first top 40 hit, peaking at number 15 on the Billboard Hot 100, while also reaching the top 10 on both the R&B and rap singles charts. The official remix featured fellow rappers Young Buck and Bun B.  
There is a second official remix featuring West Coast rappers Snoop Dogg & The Game and a new verse by Lil Flip.

Lawsuit
In 2004, Namco filed a lawsuit against Lil' Flip, Sony BMG, and several others for willful copyright infringement. The lawsuit, by Namco, filed in New York Federal Court, stemmed from "Game Over (Flip)" noticeably  sampling various sounds from the Namco games Pac-Man and Ms. Pac-Man.

It followed on the heels of a separate copyright infringement lawsuit against the same group of defendants involving Lil' Flip's previous album, Undaground Legend, which ended in a $150,000 judgement awarded to the plaintiffs.

Namco's lawsuit, however, was settled amicably before reaching trial, for an undisclosed sum, along with the parties releasing a joint statement which read, “Namco and Sony BMG are pleased to have resolved this matter and we look forward to continuing our business relationship in the spirit of our mutual respect for intellectual property.”

Charts

Weekly charts

Year-end charts

Certifications

Release history

References

2003 songs
2004 singles
Lil' Flip songs
Columbia Records singles
Songs written by Lil' Flip